Dwight Cook (born December 14, 1951) is an American politician who served as a member of the North Dakota Senate for the 34th district from 1997 to 2020. He is a member of the Republican party.

References

Living people
1951 births
Republican Party North Dakota state senators
People from Moorhead, Minnesota
21st-century American politicians